Jawahar Chowk is an area located in Ahmedabad, India.

References

Neighbourhoods in Ahmedabad
Monuments and memorials to Jawaharlal Nehru